Wilson Wallis may refer to:

Wilson Dallam Wallis (1886–1970), American anthropologist
W. Allen Wallis (1912–1998), American economist and statistician